The following is the filmography of Canadian-American actor, comedian and filmmaker Seth Rogen.

Film

As director/writer/producer

Film acting roles

Television

As director/writer/producer

TV acting roles

Video games

Music videos

References

Male actor filmographies
Director filmographies
American filmographies
Canadian filmographies